Eulima modicella is a species of sea snail, a marine gastropod mollusk in the family Eulimidae. The species is one of a number within the genus Eulima.

Distribution
This marine species is endemic to Australia and occurs off Queensland

References

 Sowerby, G.B. (ed.) 1854. Thesaurus Conchyliorum or monographs of genera of shells. London : Sowerby Vol. 2 pp. 439–899

External links
 To World Register of Marine Species

modicella
Gastropods described in 1851
Gastropods of Australia